Arcadia Airport may refer to:

 Arcadia–Bienville Parish Airport in Arcadia, Louisiana, United States (FAA: 5F0)
 Arcadia Municipal Airport in Arcadia, Florida, United States (FAA: X06)